Subjectivist (foaled 30 March 2017) is a British Thoroughbred racehorse best known for his performances over extended distances. As a two-year-old he showed some promise, winning one minor race from seven attempts as well as finishing runner-up in the Listed Stonehenge Stakes. In the following year he won the Listed Glasgow Stakes, the Group 3 March Stakes as well as being placed in the King George V Stakes and the Gordon Stakes before ending his season with a Group 1 victory in the Prix Royal Oak. As a four-year-old he won the Dubai Gold Cup and the Ascot Gold Cup

Background
Subjectivist is a bay horse with a small white star bred in England by Mascalls Stud. In October 2018 he was consigned to the Tattersalls October Yearling Sale and was bought for 62,000 guineas by the trainer Mark Johnston. He entered the ownership of Dr Jim Walker, a Scottish-born, Hong Kong-based economist, and was taken into training by Johnston at Middleham Moor, North Yorkshire.

He was from the ninth crop of foals sired by Teofilo the undefeated European Champion Two-Year-Old of 2006. Teofilo's other European offspring have included Cross Counter, Trading Leather, Pleascach, Twilight Payment and Parish Hall: he has also had great success in Australia where his major winners have included Happy Clapper, Humidor and Kermadec. Subjectivist's dam Reckoning showed good racing ability, winning one minor race and being placed in the Hoppings Stakes, Gillies Fillies' Stakes and Festival Stakes. As a broodmare, she had previously produced Sir Ron Priestley who won the March Stakes and finished second in the St Leger. She was a great-granddaughter of the Irish broodmare La Meillure, making her a close relative of Soldier of Fortune and the Gran Criterium winner Sholokhov as well as a more distant relative of Double Form.

Racing career

2019: two-year-old season
Subjectivist began his racing career by finishing second in a novice race (for horses with no more than two previous wins) over seven furlongs on heavy ground at Haydock Park on 7 June. Two weeks later over the same course and distance he went off the 4/11 favourite for a maiden race but was beaten a length into second place by Mystery Power. He was ridden by Jason Hart in a novice race on the synthetic Polytrack surface at Chelmsford City Racecourse on 5 July and recorded his first victory as he took the lead approaching the final furlong and drew away from his three opponents to win "very easily" by seven lengths. The colt was then stepped up in class for the Listed Pat Eddery Stakes later that month but ran poorly and came home last of the six runners. In August he finished second to Mohican Heights in the Stonehenge Stakes at Salisbury Racecourse and in the following month he ran fourth behind Pyledriver in the Ascendant Stakes at Haydock. For his final run of the year he was moved up to Group 3 class for the ten-furlong Zetland Stakes at Newmarket Racecourse but after leading for most of the way he dropped out of contention in the final furlong and came home seventh of the eight runners behind Max Vega.

2020: three-year-old season
The 2020 flat racing season in England was disrupted by the COVID-19 Pandemic and Subjectivist did not reappear until 17 June when he started at odds of 22/1 for the King George V Stakes over one and a half miles at Royal Ascot and finished third behind Hukum and Kipps. On 7 July he carried top weight of 133 pounds in a handicap race over one and three quarter miles at Haydock and finished second by a length to Favorite Moon to whom he was conceding 20 pounds in weight. On 16 July Subjectivist was ridden by Joe Fanning in the Listed Glasgow Stakes over 11 furlongs at Hamilton Park Racecourse. Starting the 7/4 favourite in a five-runner field he led from the start and steadily wound up the pace to win by one and three quarter lengths from Tritonic, with four lengths back to Tulip Fields in third place. After the race Mark Johnston said "This horse could be targeted at the St Leger as his half-brother Sir Ron Priestley was second in last year’s Leger. They have similar profiles although Subjectivist is rated higher at this stage of his career. He is a lovely horse and very progressive – obviously he will be suited by a step back up in trip".

Two weeks after his win at Hamilton, similar tactics were employed by Fanning on Subjectivist in the Group 3 Gordon Stakes at Goodwood Racecourse but on this occasion he was overtaken inside the final furlong and was beaten into third place by Mogul and Highland Chief. In the Group 2 Great Voltigeur Stakes at York Racecourse on 19 August he set the pace again but faded badly in the last quarter mile and came home seventh behind Pyledriver, beaten eight lengths by the winner. Ten days later Subjectivist went off the 11/10 favourite in a four-runner field for the March Stakes over fourteen furlongs at Goodwood. Fanning sent him into the lead from the start and the colt drew away from his opponents in the straight to win by fifteen lengths from the filly Cabaletta (winner of the Aphrodite Stakes). Johnston said: “It was not the plan to come here... We went to the Voltigeur... but it didn't work. I felt straight afterwards that we had to come here to see if he was a better horse over a mile and six... When it broke up to a small field we had to go for it. On the basis of that, he will have an easy fortnight now and provided he is OK, he will go to the Leger."

In the Group 1 St Leger Stakes over fourteen and a half furlongs at Doncaster Racecourse on 12 September at Doncaster Racecourse Subjectivist started a 16/1 outsider and came home seventh behind Galileo Chrome weakening in the closing stages after disputing the lead for most of the way. On 25 October Subjectivist was sent to France for the Prix Royal-Oak over 3100 metres on heavy ground at Longchamp Racecourse in which he was matched against older horses for the first time. He started the 6/1 third favourite behind Valia (Prix Chaudenay) and Princess Zoe in an eight-runner field which also included Holdthasigreen (winner of the race in 2018). With Fanning in the saddle, Subjectivist made all the running and kept on well in the straight to win by two lengths from Valia, despite hanging to the left in the closing stages. Mark Johnston commented "He's hung in the straight, and if he'd lost, we would have been very upset, but as he's won, it doesn't really matter. It's fantastic. Staying has always been the plan for him, and he's just done it a little bit sooner than we had originally planned. The idea was that he would always be a Cup horse for next year, and he's proved himself a Cup horse already."

2021: four-year-old season
Subjectivist won the Ascot Gold Cup as a four-year-old.

Pedigree

Subjectivist was inbred 3 × 3 to Danehill, meaning that this stallion twice in the third generation of his pedigree. He was also inbred 3 × 4 to Sadler's Wells.

References

2017 racehorse births
Racehorses bred in the United Kingdom
Racehorses trained in the United Kingdom
Thoroughbred family 14-c